Tara Duncan may refer to:

 Tara Duncan (media executive), American entertainment industry executive
 Tara Duncan (novel series), a French novel series
 Tara Duncan (TV series), a French television series